Don Lee Fred Nilsen (born October 19, 1934) is an American linguist and humor scholar. He is Professor of Linguistics in the Emeritus College at Arizona State University. He has published extensively on semantics, deep cases, and humor. Together with his wife Alleen Nilsen, Nilsen is co-founder of the International Society for Humor Studies and served as its executive secretary. Alongside Alleen Nilsen, he was also Co-President of American Name Society.

Work 
Don Lee Fred Nilsen was born in 1934 in Palmyra, Utah, United States. He obtained his Bachelor's degree in French from Brigham Young University in 1958, followed by a Master's degree in Linguistics from American University in 1961, and a PhD in Linguistics from the University of Michigan in 1971. Since 1971, he has worked at Arizona State University.

Don Nilsen's areas of interest in English Linguistics include Semantics, Pragmatics, and Discourse Theory. He has a particular interest in sophisticated discourse forms: Double Entendre, Symbolism, Metaphor, Irony, Parody, Paradox, Wit, Symbolism, Humor, Comedy and Tragi-comedy.

Together with his wife Alleen Nilsen, Nilsen founded the International Society for Humor Studies. Nilsen served as executive secretary of the organization until 2005 and is still the organization’s historian. In 2014, the Association of Applied and Therapeutic Humor named Don and Alleen Nilsen recipients of the Doug Fletcher Lifetime Achievement Award for their significant contribution to the understanding and application of humor.

Select bibliography 
 The instrumental case in English: syntactic and semantic considerations (1973) Mouton
 Language Play: An Introduction to Linguistics (w/ Alleen Nilsen) (1978) Newbury House Publishers
 Humor in American Literature: A Selected Annotated Bibliography (1992) Routledge
 Humor in Irish Literature: A Reference Guide (1996) Greenwood Press
 Humor in Eighteenth- and Nineteenth-century British Literature (1998) Greenwood Press
 Encyclopedia of 20th-century American Humor (w/ Alleen Nilsen) (2000) Oryx Press
 The Language of Humor: An Introduction (w/ Alleen Nilsen) (2018) Cambridge University Press

References 

Humor researchers
University of Michigan alumni
Linguists from the United States
1934 births
Arizona State University faculty
Brigham Young University alumni
Living people
American University alumni